Events in the year 1942 in Spain.

Incumbents
Caudillo: Francisco Franco

Events 

 August 16 - Begoña Bombing

Births
 January 2 - Jesús Glaría, footballer. (d. 1978)
 February 4 - Joaquim Rifé, footballer.
 February 9 - Manuel Castells, sociologist.
 February 28 - Bernardo Adam Ferrero, composer (d. 2022)
 May 29 – Óscar Alzaga, jurist and politician
 December 2 - Vicente López Carril, racing cyclist. (d. 1980)
 December 14 - Juan Diego, actor. (d. 2022)

Deaths
 April 26 - Romà Forns.
 June 8 - José Pellicer Gandía. (b. 1912)
 Undated
Agustín Olguera, painter (b. 1906)

See also
List of Spanish films of the 1940s

References

 
Years of the 20th century in Spain
1940s in Spain
Spain
Spain